Chislet windmill was a Grade II listed smock mill in Chislet, Kent, England. It was built in 1744 and burnt down on 15 October 2005.

History

The earliest record of a mill at Chislet is from 1666. Chislet windmill was built in 1744. It was marked on Murdoch Mackenzie's map of 1774 and the 1819-43 Ordnance Survey map and subsequent maps. The mill was working until 1916, when the cap and sails blew off in a gale, it is said that the fantail was tied up by the tenant of the Mill House and thus was unable to turn the mill into wind, thus leading to the mill being tailwinded. During the Second World War, Barnes Wallis lived in the Mill House, and watched the tests of the bouncing bomb at nearby Reculver from the top of the mill. The corrugated iron clad tower of the mill, with a simple roof over and retaining its major machinery stood until 15 October 2005 when it was destroyed by fire.

In 2011, a replica mill was built on the site of the old mill as part of a new house.

Description

Chislet windmill was a three-storey black smock mill on a low brick base, with four spring sails. The mill was winded by a fantail. The mill drove three pairs of millstones. The Wallower, Upright Shaft, Great Spur Wheel and two of the three Stone Nuts were wood, the third Stone Nut was iron.

Millers

Anthony May 1765-89
M May 1795
Henry Collard 1847
Jonathan Packer 1862
John Wootton 1878
Thomas Wooton
John Walter Wooton - 1918

References for above:-

References

External links
Windmill World page on the mill.

Windmills in Kent
Grinding mills in the United Kingdom
Smock mills in England
Grade II listed buildings in Kent
Windmills completed in 1744
Octagonal buildings in the United Kingdom
1744 establishments in England